Korean opera may refer to:

Changgeuk, Korean musical drama since 1902
Korean revolutionary opera, North Korean music theatre since 1971
Western opera in Korean

See also
Korea National Opera
Korean theatre